The Royal Sydney Yacht Squadron is a yacht club located in North Sydney, Australia in the suburb of Kirribilli. The squadron was founded in 1862. It has occupied its grounds in East Kirribilli, near Kirribilli House, since 1902.

History
The Royal Sydney Yacht Squadron was founded when nineteen yachtsmen met in the office of William Walker MLC on 8 July 1862, to found a yacht club to be designated 'the Australian Yacht Club'. An application was made for a Royal Warrant and the Patronage of the Prince of Wales. On 27 June 1863 the Commodore, the William Walker MLC, received a letter from the Colonial Secretary's Office notifying him of the Prince of Wales' willingness to become Patron of the 'Royal Sydney Yacht Squadron'. This letter also issued an Admiralty Warrant authorising the use of the Blue Ensign of Her Majesty's Fleet. The present patron is Prince Philip, Duke of Edinburgh.

It was not until 1902 that the squadron was able to lease a property at Wudyong Point on the eastern side of Kirribilli, with a stone cottage, a landing stage and a slipway. The site was occupied on 24 January 1903.  The whale's jawbones, forming an archway over the pathway, had come from a whaling station at Twofold Bay. The flagstaff was salvaged from the collier Bellambi and presented by F.G.W. Waley Esq.

The Royal Sydney Yacht Squadron is one of the main members of the International Council of Yacht Clubs.

The squadron was patronaged by Prince Philip.

International Americas Cup Challenges
1962 RSYS Challenged the New York Yacht Club for the Americas Cup. The Gretel lost 4-1.  
1970 RSYS again raced in Newport Rhode Island.  The Gretel II lost 4-1.

Purpose
The Royal Sydney Yacht Squadron is a private member sailing club.  The squadron grounds, facilities and services are provided for the enjoyment and utilization of members and invited guests in their company.  The Royal Sydney Yacht Squadron is not open to the public.

The Squadron's main objective is to promote sailing as a sport.

Youth Sailing
The squadron’s Youth Sailing program commenced in 1960.  The aims of the program are, broadly stated, to foster and promote sailing and to provide young men and women with social skills, confidence, values and friends that will place them in goods stead to approach the challenges of life.

The youth program uses 3 Laser Classes, 4.7, Radial and Standard, and the Optimist Class, as well as Pacers
and Elliot 7s.

See also

International Council of Yacht Clubs
 Harry Andreas – Rear Commodore RSYS
 Frank Packer Vice Commodore RSYS
 Sydney Flying Squadron, neighbouring club

Further reading
 Sydney Sails : The Story of the Royal Sydney Yacht Squadron's First 100 Years (1862-1962), compiled for the Squadron's committee by P. R. Stephensen ; with preface by H.R.H. the Prince Philip, Duke of Edinburgh, Angus and Robertson, 1962
 Royal Sydney Yacht Squadron 1862-2000, written by Jim Murrant for the Squadron's committee, Royal Sydney Yacht Squadron, 2000,

References

External links

 Royal Sydney Yacht Squadron

Yacht clubs in New South Wales
America's Cup yacht clubs
Sport in Sydney
1862 establishments in Australia
Organisations based in Australia with royal patronage
1987 America's Cup
Sports teams in Sydney
Sports clubs established in 1862